Octopus: The Best of Syd Barrett, released 29 May 1992, is a one-disc compilation of songs by Syd Barrett. It contains songs from his two solo albums, The Madcap Laughs and Barrett, and the compilation outtakes/rarities album, Opel. This album was later superseded by The Best of Syd Barrett: Wouldn't You Miss Me?.

Track listing
 "Octopus" – 3:48
 "Swan Lee (Silas Lang)" – 3:14
 "Baby Lemonade" – 4:10
 "Late Night" – 3:14
 "Wined and Dined" – 2:56
 "Golden Hair" – 2:00
 "Gigolo Aunt" – 5:45
 "Wolfpack" – 3:45
 "It Is Obvious" – 2:56
 "Lanky (Part 1)" – 5:32
 "No Good Trying" – 3:25
 "Clowns and Jugglers" – 3:27
 "Waving My Arms in the Air" – 2:07
 "Opel" – 6:26

References

1992 greatest hits albums
Syd Barrett albums